Melekeok FC was a Palauan association football club which competed in the Palau Soccer League, the top level league in Palau, in 2009, when they were crowned champions. Due to fragmentary records, it is not known how many other seasons they competed.

References

Football clubs in Palau